Paul Strathern (born 1940) is a Scots-Irish writer and academic. He was born in London, and studied at Trinity College, Dublin, after which he served in the Merchant Navy over a period of two years. He then lived on a Greek island. In 1966, he travelled overland to India and the Himalayas. His novel A Season in Abyssinia won a Somerset Maugham Award in 1972.

Besides five novels, he has also written books on science, philosophy, history, literature, medicine and economics. He is the author of two series of short introductory books: Philosophers in 90 Minutes and The Big Idea: Scientists Who Changed the World. His book on the history of chemistry entitled Mendeleyev's Dream (2000) was short-listed for the Aventis Prize, and his works have been translated into over two dozen languages. He is the author of The Medici: Godfathers of the Renaissance, Napoleon in Egypt, and The Artist, the Philosopher and the Warrior: Leonardo, Machiavelli and Borgia - a fateful collusion (2009) and The Spirit of Venice: from Marco Polo to Casanova   (2012). His recent works include The Periodic Table (2015), "Quacks, Rogues and Charlatans" (2015) and 'The Borgias' (2019) 'Rise and Fall: A History of the World in Ten Empires' (2019). 'The Florentines: from Dante to Galileo (Atlantic 2021). His work on economic history 'Dr Strangelove's Game' (2001) was chosen as a Google business book of the year.His most recent work 'Ten Cities that Changed The World' (2022) has been chosen as a Waterstones History Book of the Year.

Strathern was a lecturer at Kingston University, where he taught philosophy and mathematics. He has one daughter.

List of books

Novels

Pass by the Sea: A Novel (London: Weidenfeld and Nicolson, 1968)
A Season in Abyssinia: An Impersonation of Arthur Rimbaud (London: Macmillan, 1972; reissued London: Faber and Faber, 2014)
One Man's War (London: Quartet Books, 1973; reprinted 1974)
Vaslav: An Impersonation of Nijinsky (London: Quartet Books, 1975)
The Adventures of Spiro (Brighton: Harvester Press, 1979)

Academic

Exploration by Land (Silk and Spices Routes Series; London: Belitha Press for UNESCO, 1993); published in Irish as Bóthar an tSíoda: taiscéalaíocht thar tír (Baile Átha Cliath [i.e. Dublin]: An Gúm, 2000)
Mendeleyev's Dream: The Quest for the Elements (London: Hamish Hamilton, 2000; US edn. New York: St. Martins Press, 2001; reissued London: Penguin, 2001)
Dr Strangelove's Game: A Brief History of Economic Genius (London: Hamish Hamilton, 2001; reissued London: Penguin, 2002); also published as A Brief History of Economic Genius (New York; London: Texere, 2002)
The Medici: Godfathers of the Renaissance (London: Jonathan Cape, 2003; reissued London: Vintage Books, 2007); also published as The Medici: Power, Money, and Ambition in the Italian Renaissance (New York: Pegasus Books, 2016); published in Italian as I Medici: potere, denaro e ambizione (I volti della storia, no. 427; Pisa: Newton Compton, 2017) and Russian
A Brief History of Medicine from Hippocrates to Gene Therapy (London: Robinson, 2005)
Napoleon in Egypt: The Greatest Glory (London: Jonathan Cape, 2007; reissued London: Vintage, 2008)
The Artist, the Philosopher and the Warrior: Leonardo, Machiavelli and Borgia. A Fateful Collusion (London: Jonathan Cape, 2009; reissued London: Vintage, 2010)
Death in Florence: the Medici, Savonarola and the Battle for the Soul of the Renaissance City (London: Jonathan Cape, 2011; reissued London: Vintage, 2012)
The Spirit of Venice: from Marco Polo to Casanova (London: Jonathan Cape, 2012; reissued London: Pimlico, 2013; digital edn. London: Vintage Digital, 2012)
The Periodic Table (The Knowledge Series, no. 3; London: Quadrille, 2015)
Quacks, Rogues and Charlatans of the R[oyal] C[ollege of] P[hysicians]: 50 Books from the College Collection (500 Reflections on the R[oyal] C[ollege of] P[hysicians], 1518-2018; London: Little, Brown, 2016)
 The Borgias: Power and Fortune (Atlantic 2019)
 Rise and Fall: A History of the World in Ten Empires (Hodder 2019)
 The Florentines: from Dante to Galileo (Atlantic 2021)
 Ten Cities That Changed The World (Hodder 2022)
 The Other Renaissance: From Copernicus to Shakespeare (Atlantic 2022)

Philosophers in 90 Minutes/Virgin Philosophers

Wittgenstein (1889-1951) in 90 Minutes (Philosophers in 90 Minutes Series; London: Constable, 1996); reissued as The Essential Wittgenstein (Virgin Philosophers Series; London: Virgin, 2002)
Hume (1711-76) in 90 Minutes (Philosophers in 90 Minutes Series; London: Constable, 1996); reissued as The Essential Hume (Virgin Philosophers Series; London: Virgin, 2002); published in French as Hume, je connais! (Air de savoir. Série Les philosophes, je connais; Paris: Mallard Editions, 1998)
Kant (1724-1804) in 90 Minutes (Philosophers in 90 Minutes Series; London: Constable, 1996); reissued as The Essential Kant (Virgin Philosophers Series; London: Virgin, 2002)
Locke (1632-1704) in 90 Minutes (Philosophers in 90 Minutes Series; London: Constable, 1996)
Descartes in 90 Minutes (Philosophers in 90 Minutes Series; Chicago: I.R. Dee, 1996); reissued as The Essential Descartes (Virgin Philosophers Series; London: Virgin, 2002)
Plato (428-348 BC) in 90 Minutes (Philosophers in 90 Minutes Series; London: Constable, 1996); reissued as The Essential Plato (Virgin Philosophers Series; London: Virgin, 2002)
Aristotle (384-322 BC) in 90 Minutes (Philosophers in 90 Minutes Series; London: Constable, 1996); reissued as The Essential Aristotle (Virgin Philosophers Series; London: Virgin, 2002)
Nietzsche (1844-1900) in 90 Minutes (Philosophers in 90 Minutes Series; London: Constable, 1996); reissued as The Essential Nietzsche (Virgin Philosophers Series; London: Virgin, 2002)
St. Augustine in 90 Minutes (Philosophers in 90 Minutes Series; London: Constable, 1997)
Sartre in 90 Minutes (Philosophers in 90 Minutes Series; Chicago: Ivan R. Dee, 1998); reissued as The Essential Sartre (Virgin Philosophers Series; London: Virgin, 2002)
Machiavelli in 90 Minutes (Philosophers in 90 Minutes Series; Chicago: Ivan R. Dee, 1998); reissued as The Essential Machiavelli (Virgin Philosophers Series; London: Virgin, 2002)
Confucius in 90 Minutes (Philosophers in 90 Minutes Series; Chicago: Ivan R. Dee, 1999); reissued as The Essential Confucius (Virgin Philosophers Series; London: Virgin, 2002)
Foucault in 90 Minutes (Philosophers in 90 Minutes Series; Chicago: Ivan R. Dee, 2000); reissued as The Essential Foucault (Virgin Philosophers Series; London: Virgin, 2002)
Marx in 90 Minutes Philosophers in 90 Minutes Series; Chicago: Ivan R. Dee, 2001); reissued as The Essential Marx (Virgin Philosophers Series; London: Virgin, 2002)
The Essential Derrida (Virgin Philosophers Series; London: Virgin, 2003)
The Essential Hegel (Virgin Philosophers Series; London: Virgin, 2003)
The Essential Rousseau (Virgin Philosophers Series; London: Virgin, 2002)
The Essential Socrates (Virgin Philosophers Series; London: Virgin, 2003)
The Essential Spinoza (Virgin Philosophers Series; London: Virgin, 2003)
Great Writers in 90 Minutes 

Beckett in 90 minutes (London:Ivan R.Dee, 2004) 
Dostoievsky in 90 minutes (London: Ivan R.Dee, 2004) 
Garcia Marquez in 90 minutes (London: Ivan R.Dee, 2004) 
Kafka in 90 minutes (London: Ivan R.Dee, 2004) 
Nabokov in 90 minutes (London: Ivan R.Dee, 2004) 
James Joyce in 90 minutes (London: Ivan R.Dee, 2005)
D.H.Lawrence in 90 minutes (London: Ivan R.Dee, 2005) 
Hemingway in 90 minutes (London:Ivan R.Dee, 2005) 
Virginia Woolf in 90 minutes (London: Ivan R.Dee, 2005) 
Borges in 90 minutes (London: Ivan R.Dee, 2006) 
Tolstoy in 90 minutes (London: Ivan R.Dee, 2006) 
The Big Idea: Scientists Who Changed the World

Pythagoras & His Theorem (Big Idea Series; London: Arrow, 1997)
Turing & the Computer (Big Idea Series; London: Arrow, 1997)
Hawking & Black Holes (Big Idea Series; London: Arrow, 1997)
Newton & Gravity (Big Idea Series; London: Arrow, 1997)
Crick, Watson & DNA (Big Idea Series; London: Arrow, 1997)
Einstein & Relativity (Big Idea Series; London: Arrow, 1997)
Galileo & the Solar System (Big Idea Series; London: Arrow, 1998)
Bohr & Quantum Theory (Big Idea Series; London: Arrow, 1998)
Oppenheimer & the Bomb (Big Idea Series; London: Arrow, 1998)
Curie & Radioactivity (Big Idea Series; London: Arrow, 1998)
Archimedes & the Fulcrum (Big Idea Series; London: Arrow, 1998)
Darwin & Evolution (Big Idea Series; London: Arrow, 1998)

Travel

Greece and the Greek Islands: The Versatile Guide (London: Duncan Petersen, 1994; 2nd edn. 1996)
Florida: Travel Planner & Guide (London: Duncan Petersen, 1996)
Australia : Travel Planner & Guide (London: Duncan Peterson, 1997)

References

External links
 
 Washington Post review of The Artist, the Philosopher and the Warrior (2009)

British writers
Academics of Kingston University
1940 births
Living people
British historians
Heidegger scholars
Historians of philosophy